Closepet Dasappa Narasimhaiah (1921–2005) was an Indian writer, literary critic and the principal of Maharaja's College, Mysore. Narasimhaiah was best known for his literary criticisms and for bringing out an abridged version of Discovery of India of Jawaharlal Nehru, under the title, Rediscovery of India. He was a recipient of the Rajyotsava Prashasti honor of the Government of Karnataka. The Government of India awarded him the third highest civilian honour, the Padma Bhushan, in 1990, for his contributions to literature.

Biography 
Born in Closepet (present-day Ramanagara) of Ramanagara district in the south Indian state of Karnataka on 21 May 1921 to a shopkeeper, Narasimhaiah graduated from the University of Mysore and did his higher studies at the Universities of Cambridge and Princeton before joining Maharaja's College, Mysore as a professor of English literature in 1950. He became the principal of the institution in 1957 and worked there till his superannuation in 1962. In between, he served as a Fulbright visiting professor at Yale University for the academic year 1958–59 and after his retirement from Mysore University, served the University of Queensland as a visiting professor in 1963. Later, joining with a few like-minded personalities, he founded Dhvanyaloka Centre For Indian Studies, a centre for promoting studies on Indian culture and arts, in 1979. He also served as the resident scholar of International Research Centre, Bellagio (1968) and as a consultant to East-West Centre, Hawaii for two terms (1974–75 and 1987).

Narasimhaiah, the first patron of Asian origin of the Association of the Study of Australia in Asia (ASAA), published several books on literature, culture and arts, the abridged version of Discovery of India of Jawaharlal Nehru, published in 1981 by the Jawaharlal Nehru Memorial Fund is the most notable among them. Jawaharlal Nehru: A Study of His Writings and Speeches, The writer's Gandhi, The Human Idioms (Three lectures on Jawaharlal Nehru),The Swan and the Eagle: Essays on Indian English Literature, Raja Rao, Makers of Indian English literature and The Flowering of Australian Literature are some of the other books published by him.

Narasimhaiah was married to Ramalakshamma and the couple had a son, C. N. Srinath who co-wrote some of his books, and a daughter. He died in Bengaluru, at his daughter's house, on 12 April 2005, at the age of 83, survived by his children; his wife had preceded him in death. His life is documented in an autobiography, N for Nobody: Autobiography of an English Teacher, published in 1991, as a part of New world literature series.

Awards and honors 
The Government of Karnataka awarded him the Rajyotsava Prashasthi, the second highest civilian honor of the State in 1987. He received the Padma Bhushan, the third highest civilian honor in the country from the Government of India in 1990. The University of Mysore conferred the degree of DLitt (honoris causa) on him in 2001 and the University of Bangalore followed suit in 2005. He held the fellowships of several institutions which included Indian Institute of Advanced Studies (1968), Leeds University (1971–72), Texas University (1972–73 and 1975–76), Peradeniya University, (1979) and Flinders University (1980). Theory in Practice: Essays in Honour of C.D. Narasimhaiah is a book published in honor of Narasimhaiah, in 2001, and "C.D. Narasimhaiah's Contribution to Post-Colonial Literary Criticism" is a study of his writings.

Bibliography

See also 

 Discovery of India
 Maharaja's College, Mysore

References 

Recipients of the Padma Bhushan in literature & education
1921 births
2005 deaths
Scholars from Karnataka
University of Mysore alumni
Academic staff of the University of Mysore
Alumni of the University of Cambridge
Princeton University alumni
Yale University faculty
Academic staff of the University of Queensland
Recipients of the Rajyotsava Award 1969
Indian male writers
20th-century Indian historians
Indian literary critics
Indian literary historians
People from Ramanagara
Indian expatriates in the United Kingdom
Indian expatriates in the United States
Indian expatriates in Australia